NEAT may refer to:

Science and technology
 Near-Earth Asteroid Tracking, a program run by NASA  and the JPL to discover near-Earth objects
 Neuroevolution of augmenting topologies, a genetic algorithm for the generation of evolving artificial neural networks 
 NEAT chipset, a three-chip chipset for IBM PC compatible computers.  The acronym stands for "New Enhanced Advanced Technology." 
 Non-exercise associated thermogenesis, a way of heat production in organisms
 National Electronic Autocoding Technique, a language for NCR 315 computers

Other uses
 NRLA (German abbreviation NEAT), the New Railway Link through the Alps
 North European Aerospace Test range, an organisation operating rocket test ranges in Sweden
 Northeast Asia Trade Tower, an office building in South Korea
 New England Air Transport, an airline operating in Maine from 2008 to 2009
 National Exchange for Automated Trading, the trading system of the National Stock Exchange of India
 National English Ability Test, a Korean standardized test of ability in English

See also
 Neat (disambiguation)
 Neet (disambiguation)